Kawamata Dam is an arch dam located in Tochigi prefecture in Japan. The dam is used for flood control and power production. The catchment area of the dam is 179.4 km2. The dam impounds about 259  ha of land when full and can store 87600 thousand cubic meters of water. The construction of the dam was started on 1957 and completed in 1966.

References

Dams in Tochigi Prefecture
1966 establishments in Japan